This is a list of artists who were born in the China or whose artworks are closely associated with that country.

Architects

Contemporary artists

Painters

Photographers

Printmakers 

 Li Hua (1907–1994), woodcut artist and communist
 Yan Han (1916–2011), printmaker and painter; chairman of the Chinese Printmakers' Association and standing director of the Chinese Artists' Association
 Zheng Shuang (born 1936), educator and woodcut artist
 Zhu Gui (1644–1717), woodcut artist

See also 
 List of Chinese people
 List of Chinese women artists

Artists 
Artists
Chinese